La Danse is a painting created by nineteenth-century French artist William-Adolphe Bouguereau in 1856. The painting is currently held in the Musée d'Orsay in Paris.

The work, commissioned in 1855 by Anatole Bartholoni to decorate a living room at his Paris hotel, represents dance in an allegorical manner. Other canvases in the set are held at the United States Embassy in Paris.

The canvas was donated by Captain Peter Moore to the National Museums for the Musée d'Orsay in 1981. It was then attributed to the Musée du Louvre, which finally assigned it to the Musée d'Orsay the same year.

See also
 William-Adolphe Bouguereau gallery

References

External links
William-Adolphe Bouguereau at the Web Museum

Paintings by William-Adolphe Bouguereau
Paintings in the collection of the Musée d'Orsay
1856 paintings
Dance in art